The 2001 Rally Argentina (formally the 21st Rally Argentina) was the fifth round of the 2001 World Rally Championship. The race was held over four days between 3 May and 6 May 2001, and was won by Ford's Colin McRae, his 21st win in the World Rally Championship.

Background

Entry list

Itinerary
All dates and times are ART (UTC−3).

Results

Overall

World Rally Cars

Classification

Special stages

Championship standings

FIA Cup for Production Rally Drivers

Classification

Special stages

Championship standings

References

External links 
 Official website of the World Rally Championship

Argentina
Rally Argentina
Rally